Cornelia Johanna "Carola" Schouten (born 6 October 1977) is a Dutch politician serving as third Deputy Prime Minister of the Netherlands and Minister for Poverty Policy, Participation and Pensions in the IV Rutte Cabinet since 10 January 2022. She has served as Minister of Agriculture, Nature and Food Quality in the Third Rutte cabinet from 2017-2022. She is a member of the Christian Union (CU).

Early life and education
A native of 's-Hertogenbosch, Schouten grew up in Waardhuizen, managing her deceased father's dairy farm with her mother and her two sisters for four years, after which time the family ended the farming activities and moved to neighbouring village of Giessen (Waardhuizen and Giessen are nowadays located in the new municipality of Altena).

She attended Altena College in Sleeuwijk and studied business administration at Erasmus University Rotterdam with a year abroad at Tel Aviv University. Schouten worked at the Ministry of Social Affairs and Employment from 2000 to 2006. Subsequently, she was an assistant to the Christian Union parliamentary group, entering into politics.

Political career
Schouten became a member of the House of Representatives in 2011 upon the resignation of former Deputy Prime Minister André Rouvoet. In parliament, she served as her group’s spokesperson on financial policy.

Schouten and party leader Gert-Jan Segers participated in the negotiations of forming the third government led by Prime Minister Mark Rutte, which she entered as Deputy Prime Minister. From autumn 2019 she faced farmers' protests because of government's measures involving decreasing the number of livestock. In 2020, Schouten suggested the EU should begin to adjust animal welfare regulations  and limit live animal exports. From 2021, she led efforts on legislation on reducing damaging ammonia pollution.

Personal life
Schouten is single with a child and is a member of the Reformed Churches in the Netherlands (Liberated). She lives in Rotterdam. Her younger sister Marjan van der Meij-Schouten is a member of the municipal council of Altena, like her older sister on behalf of the Christian Union.

See also
Dutch farmers' protests

References

External links

Official
  Drs. C.J. (Carola) Schouten, Parlement.com
 Curriculum Vitae Carola Schouten, Government of the Netherlands

1977 births
Living people
20th-century Dutch civil servants
21st-century Dutch civil servants
21st-century Dutch politicians
21st-century Dutch women politicians
Christian Union (Netherlands) politicians
Deputy Prime Ministers of the Netherlands
Erasmus University Rotterdam alumni
Members of the House of Representatives (Netherlands)
Ministers of Agriculture of the Netherlands
People from 's-Hertogenbosch
Politicians from Rotterdam
People from Waardhuizen
Reformed Churches (Liberated) Christians from the Netherlands
Women government ministers of the Netherlands
20th-century Dutch women
20th-century Dutch people